Dylan Armando Flores Knowles (born 30 May 1993) is a Costa Rican professional footballer who plays as an attacking midfielder for Liga FPD club Cartaginés.

Club career

Politehnica Iași

In the summer of 2018, after an impressive season for Cartaginés in the Costa Rican top flight, Flores moved to Romanian Liga I club Politehnica Iași. He later signed a two year contract with the Moldavian side and was given the number ten shirt. On 3 September 2018, Flores registered his first goal for his new club in a 3–0 league win over Concordia Chiajna.

International career
Flores was called up for most of Costa Rica's youth teams, including Costa Rica U17, Costa Rica U20 and Costa Rica U23. On 17 November 2018, he made his full international debut for the Costa Rica national team, coming in as a substitute in a 3–2 victory over Chile.

International stats

Honours

Club
Deportivo Saprissa
Liga FPD: 2013–14, 2015–16
Costa Rican Cup: 2013

References

External links
 

1993 births
Footballers from San José, Costa Rica
Living people
Costa Rican footballers
Costa Rica international footballers
Association football midfielders
Liga FPD players
Primeira Liga players
Liga I players
Deportivo Saprissa players
C.S. Cartaginés players
C.D. Tondela players
FC Politehnica Iași (2010) players
Sepsi OSK Sfântu Gheorghe players
L.D. Alajuelense footballers
Costa Rican expatriate footballers
Expatriate footballers in Portugal
Costa Rican expatriate sportspeople in Portugal
Expatriate footballers in Romania
Costa Rican expatriate sportspeople in Romania
Costa Rica under-20 international footballers
Costa Rica youth international footballers